"I'm Looking for the One (To Be with Me)" is a song by American hip hop duo DJ Jazzy Jeff & The Fresh Prince, released as the third single from their fifth studio album, Code Red (1993). It peaked at number 79 on the US Billboard Hot 100. The song samples "Tell Me If You Still Care", a song sung by the S.O.S. Band and written by Jimmy Jam & Terry Lewis.

Critical reception
In his weekly UK chart commentary, James Masterton felt that here, the rappers are "moving back into the more laidback groove that first brought them Top 10 success in 1991 with "Summertime" and although probably destined not to be as big as the last hit, it stands a chance of becoming Top 20 next week." Alan Jones from Music Week described it as "a slower rap track that samples the SOS Band's "Tell Me If You Still Care", and includes some nice vocoder work." He added, "The more gentle style works well, and the Fresh Prince's rap nicely disses gangsta rap. Not another number one, but strong enough to reach the Top 10." James Hamilton from the RM Dance Update called it a "Teddy Riley produced languid Zapp-style vocodered sinuous thigh twiner". Alex Kadis from Smash Hits gave "I'm Looking for the One (To Be with Me)" four out of five, writing, "Smoochier than "Boom", this has precise lyrical rap, funky chunky beats and strong clear vocals. Dead sexy too."

Track listings

 12-inch vinyl
 "I'm Looking for the One (To Be with Me)" (12-inch mix) – 5:25
 "I'm Looking for the One (To Be with Me)" (LP version) – 4:35
 "I'm Looking for the One (To Be with Me)" (video version) – 3:40
 "Get Hyped" - 4:38

 US CD single
 "I'm Looking for the One (To Be with Me)" (video version) – 3:40
 "I'm Looking for the One (To Be with Me)" (single edit) – 4:05
 "I'm Looking for the One (To Be with Me)" (LP version) – 4:35
 "I'm Looking for the One (To Be with Me)" (12-inch mix) – 5:25
 "I'm Looking for the One (To Be with Me)" (instrumental) – 3:40
 "I'm Looking for the One (To Be with Me)" (Peracapella) – 5:25

 UK CD single
 "I'm Looking for the One (To Be with Me)" (video version) – 3:40
 "I'm Looking for the One (To Be with Me)" (LP version) – 4:35
 "I'm Looking for the One (To Be with Me)" (12-inch mix) – 5:25
 "Get Hyped" - 4:38

 European Snap-Pack single and cassette single
 "I'm Looking for the One (To Be with Me)" (video version) – 3:40
 "Get Hyped" – 4:38

Charts

References

1993 singles
1993 songs
DJ Jazzy Jeff & The Fresh Prince songs
Jive Records singles
Song recordings produced by Teddy Riley
Songs written by Jimmy Jam and Terry Lewis
Songs written by Teddy Riley
Songs written by Will Smith